Duck soup noodles or duck leg noodles (also spelt ak-twee-mee-sua) is a style of serving noodles. The dish consists of ingredients such as duck meat in hot soup with mixed herbs and noodles.

See also
Noodle soup
Bee sua (mee sua)

Noodle soups
Duck dishes